The women's 100 metres hurdles event at the 2006 African Championships in Athletics was held at the Stade Germain Comarmond on August 10.

Results
Wind: -1.4 m/s

References
Results 

2006 African Championships in Athletics
Sprint hurdles at the African Championships in Athletics
2006 in women's athletics